Dan Willis may refer to:

Dan Willis (author) (born 1967), American fantasy and science-fiction author
Dan Willis (comedian) (born 1973), British comedian based in Australia

See also
Daniel Willis (born 1954), Australian clergyman